The South African Ice Hockey Federation (SAIHF) is the governing body that oversees ice hockey in South Africa. It was the first African nation to join the International Ice Hockey Federation.

National teams
 Men's
 Women's
 Under 20
 Under 18

2022 South Africa Participation

2021 South Africa Participation

2020 South Africa Participation

2019 South Africa Participation

2018 South Africa Participation

2017 South Africa results

Provincial associations
 Western Province Ice Hockey Association (WPIHA)
 Gauteng Ice Hockey Association (GIHA)
 Kwa-zulu Natal Ice Hockey Association (KZNIHA)
 Eastern Province Ice Hockey Association (EPIHA)

Leagues
 Cape Town Premier League
 Cape Town U/20 League
 Cape Town PeeWee League
 Gauteng Premier League
 Gauteng First Division
 Gauteng Premier U20 League
 Gauteng U18 League
 Gauteng U16 League
 Gauteng U14 League
 Ladies League

National competitions
 South African Super League
 South African Junior Interprovincial Ice Hockey Championship
 South African Ladies Interprovivial Ice Hockey Championships

See also
Ice hockey in Africa

References

External links
South Africa at IIHF.com
WPIHA at wpicehockey.co.za

Ice hockey governing bodies in Africa
Ice hockey in South Africa
International Ice Hockey Federation members
Ice